Bilenke is an urban-type settlement in Kramatorsk Raion of Donetsk Oblast in Ukraine. It belongs to Kramatorsk urban hromada, one of the hromadas of Ukraine. Population:

Demographics
Native language as of the Ukrainian Census of 2001:
 Ukrainian 57.96%
 Russian 40.50%
 Armenian 0.82%
 Hungarian 0.33%
 Belarusian 0.12%
 Moldovan 0.03%
 German and Polish 0.01%

References

Urban-type settlements in Kramatorsk Raion